Daniel Patrick Frawley (8 September 1963 – 9 September 2019) was an Australian rules football player, coach, administrator, commentator and media personality. He played 240 games for the St Kilda Football Club in the Victorian Football League (VFL)/Australian Football League (AFL) from 1984 to 1995, captaining the club for nine seasons, and won All-Australian selection and the St Kilda best and fairest award in 1988. Frawley coached the Richmond Football Club from 2000 to 2004, with his most successful season coming in 2001, when he coached Richmond to a preliminary final. He later served as chief executive officer of the AFL Coaches Association from 2008 to 2014, and had part-time roles with the Hawthorn Football Club and St Kilda.

Following his coaching career, Frawley was an AFL commentator for Fox Footy, Triple M and 1116 SEN, and also appeared on The Sunday Footy Show on the Nine Network. On television, he is best remembered for his work on the Fox Footy program Bounce, which he co-hosted alongside contemporary Jason Dunstall for over 350 episodes from 2007 to his death in 2019; on radio, he is best remembered for his work on Triple M, most notably his appearances on The Saturday Rub, from 2005 to 2016. Frawley quietly struggled with mental health problems throughout most of his time in football, but he became more open in his later years, leading him to host his own podcast on SEN dedicated to mental health, No Man Should Ever Walk Alone, from 2017 to 2018.

Frawley died in a single-vehicle car crash in Millbrook, Victoria, on 9 September 2019. His death devastated the wider football community and led to tributes from footballers, coaches, media and fans alike, including a private but broadcast memorial service on 18 September 2019.

Early life and family
Frawley was educated at St Patrick's College, Ballarat, and played country football for East Ballarat in the Ballarat Football League (BFL) and Bungaree in the Central Highlands Football League (CHFL). He grew up and worked on a potato farm in Bungaree, which led to his nickname of "Spud".

His brother Tony was the chief executive officer of AFL Northern Territory from 2005 to 2015.

Playing career

St Kilda
Frawley initially played as a forward but soon became a renowned full back. He captained the St Kilda Football Club for nine seasons over his 240-game playing career from 1984 to 1995. He was the club's best and fairest winner in 1988 and was named in the All-Australian team the same year. He was the longest serving captain of the St Kilda Football Club. He was inducted into the Saints' hall of fame in 2007.

Honours and achievements
Individual
 St Kilda Football Club Hall of Fame (inducted 2006)
 St Kilda captain: 1987–1995
 All-Australian team: 1988
 St Kilda best and fairest: 1988
 2× Australia representative honours in international rules football: 1987, 1990

Coaching career

Collingwood Football Club assistant coach (1996–1999)
After his retirement from playing, Frawley spent four years as an assistant coach at Collingwood Football Club from 1996 until 1999 under senior coach Tony Shaw.

Richmond Football Club senior coach (2000–2004) 
Frawley became the senior coach of the Richmond Football Club in 2000 when he replaced Jeff Gieschen. In his first year in the 2000 season, Richmond under Frawley just missed out of the finals by finishing ninth. In the 2001 season, he took the Tigers into the finals, where, in the preliminary finals, they were eliminated by the Brisbane Lions, who were the eventual premiers. Under Frawley, the club moved to fourth on the ladder and their first preliminary final since 1995. In the 2002 season, however, Richmond under Frawley struggled and finished 14th. At the start of the 2003 season, the initial signs were positive, with Richmond under Frawley starting with six wins and two losses to start the season; however, the club's on-field performance dropped when they lost 13 of their next 14 matches and finished 13th.

In the 2004 season, Richmond under Frawley kept struggling and finished 16th for the "wooden spoon", which was the last position on the ladder at the time. Midway through the season, Frawley announced that he would resign at the end of the 2004 season. Richmond under Frawley lost their last 14 matches of the 2004 season. Frawley was then replaced by Terry Wallace as Richmond Football Club senior coach.

Hawthorn Football Club assistant coach (2008–2014)
From 2008 until 2014, Frawley worked at Hawthorn as a part-time assistant coach.

St Kilda Football Club assistant coach (2014–2018)
He rejoined  as a backline and key-position assistant coach in November 2014. Later, and until 2018, Frawley was a part-time specialist defence coach at the St Kilda Football Club.

Post-coaching roles 
After leaving senior coaching, Frawley was a special commentator for Triple M. In June 2006, he coached a winning Victorian state of origin side in the E. J. Whitten Legends Match and became the chief executive of the AFL Coaches Association.

Media career and post-football
During his playing career, Frawley was a regular cast member on AFL Squadron alongside Garry Lyon. When he transitioned to being a commentator primarily, Frawley was a commentator for Fox Footy and was a co-host of Bounce with Jason Dunstall and Cameron Mooney, as well as a part of the 1116 SEN Footy team on Friday nights and Sunday afternoons. Earlier in his career, he was also involved with the Nine Network and Triple M as a commentator and a regular co-host on The Saturday Rub. He also hosted a Monday night show on SEN called No Man Should Ever Walk Alone on men's health topics including mental health, addiction, and lifestyle.

Personal life and death
Frawley was married to Anita, who made regular appearances on the Fox Footy Channel program Living with Footballers. They had three daughters: Chelsea, Danielle, and Keeley.

On 9 September 2019, a day after his 56th birthday, Frawley died in a single-vehicle car crash in Millbrook, Victoria. The incident occurred shortly after 1:30 pm when his car left the road and struck a tree on Old Melbourne Road between Ryans and Chapmans Roads. He was the only passenger and died at the scene of the crash. The coroner ruled his death a suicide. An examination of his brain nearly a year later found that Frawley had stage two chronic traumatic encephalopathy (CTE), a neurodegenerative disease caused by repeated head injuries; his wife Anita said she had "strongly suspected there was more going on with Danny than straightforward depression".

Tributes
The Trevor Barker Award, St Kilda's award for best and fairest player, proceeded two nights after Frawley's death and was filled with tributes to him, including speeches from teammates Stewart Loewe and Robert Harvey. The AFL announced that a moment of silence would be observed in Frawley's honour before both semifinals the following weekend (Geelong–West Coast and Brisbane–Greater Western Sydney), with all four teams also wearing black armbands. The Melbourne Storm and Canberra Raiders also observed a moment of silence for Frawley before their NRL qualifying final at AAMI Park. AFL CEO Gillon McLachlan also revealed that it was being considered that the Golden Fist award, an award for best defender that Frawley had famously created on Bounce, should become an official AFL honour. A Change.org petition about the matter had garnered 33,000 signatures in less than 48 hours.

Both radio stations Frawley had worked at—Triple M and SEN—broadcast a special joint edition of The Saturday Rub in Frawley's honour with his co-hosts James Brayshaw, Brian Taylor, Damian Barrett and Garry Lyon.

A private but broadcast memorial was held for Frawley, followed by the hearse travelling to Moorabbin Oval for a lap of honour.

In November 2020, St Kilda and the Victorian and federal governments announced the plans for a $16 million (AUD) Moorabbin Oval centre, including classroom spaces, consultation suites and breakout areas to be named the Danny Frawley Centre for Health and Wellbeing. The center launched on 1 March 2022, with the attendees including St Kilda greats Loewe and Nick Riewoldt, club CEO Matt Finnis, Frawley's broadcast colleagues Lyon and Jason Dunstall, actor and former St Kilda #1 ticket holder Eric Bana, AFL CEO Gillon McLachlan, Victorian Tourism Minister Martin Pakula and Senator Jane Hume. Frawley's #2 was also retired by the club and hangs in the centre.

In March 2021, St Kilda announced that their Round 2 game, beginning that season against Melbourne, would be called "Spud's Game: Time 2 Talk" in partnership with Movember to promote mental health. Prior to the match, the game was delayed by two minutes with Frawley's close friends Lyon, Loewe and Tony Lockett paying tribute to Frawley in the middle of the ground and asking for those that were watching to check with their mates with both teams surrounding them and his family watching on.

References

External links

 

1963 births
2019 deaths
Trevor Barker Award winners
St Kilda Football Club players
Richmond Football Club coaches
Triple M presenters
Australian rules football commentators
All-Australians (1953–1988)
Victorian State of Origin players
Australian rules footballers from Ballarat
East Ballarat Football Club players
People educated at St Patrick's College, Ballarat
Australia international rules football team players
Sportspeople with chronic traumatic encephalopathy
Road incident deaths in Victoria (Australia)